Nancy Warren is a politician who was a Democratic member of the New Hampshire House of Representatives, representing the Strafford 1st District starting in 2006.

References

External links
New Hampshire House of Representatives - Nancy Warren dead link website
Project Vote Smart - Representative Nancy Warren (NH) profile
Follow the Money - Nancy Hildebrandt-Warren
2006 campaign contributions

Democratic Party members of the New Hampshire House of Representatives
Living people
Women state legislators in New Hampshire
Year of birth missing (living people)
21st-century American women